Irena Škorić (born 1981) is a Croatian film director and screenwriter. Her first feature film was erotic drama 7 seX 7, released in 2011.  She was the president of Croatian Film Directors Guild from October 2014 to February 2015.

Filmography

References

External links

1981 births
Living people
Film people from Zagreb
Croatian film directors
Croatian screenwriters
Croatian women film directors
Croatian documentary film directors
Women documentary filmmakers